David Morris Schnarch; born September 18, 1946 in New York City, New York; died October 8, 2020 in Evergreen, Colorado) was an American couples, sex and trauma therapist, clinical psychologist and urologist.

Work 
David Schnarch was Professor of urology at the Louisiana State University Medical School in New Orleans, Louisiana and led the Marriage & Family Health Center in Evergreen, Colorado as Director. David Schnarch became known to the public through his research in the field of couple and sex therapy and related publications. Schnarch studied the widespread problem of people losing sexual desire in couple relationships, and suggested in the 1980s that the notion of self-differentiation introduced by Bowen was the real starting point for solving problems with intimacy and sexual desire. His hypothesis was that a low degree of differentiation must inevitably lead to problems with intimacy and desire and that for this reason only a higher degree of differentiation is suitable for solving these problems. Guided by these considerations, he propagated an allegedly new form of psychotherapy, which differs in principle from classic, bond-based psychotherapies and called his development the "melting pot" approach. It should be noted critically, however, that this conception of psychotherapy is anything but new, because C.G. Jung found the idea of differentiation in his conception of the "Individuation" process.

Differentiation based psychotherapy

Differentiation based psychotherapy is based on the theoretical assumptions of Murray Bowen and understands the so-called self-differentiation as a central variable for human personality development. The aim of this form of psychotherapy is to confront the client with themselves, their actions and dilemmas, to help them through a process of self-knowledge, and to find new solutions to the problems that are burdening their life and relationships.

Schnarch used his melting-pot approach in particular for the treatment of problems with initimacy and in sexual relationships. Schnarch used collaborative confrontation as a central element in his therapy.

Therapy should help people to find a more balanced psychological balance when their own self ("Who am I and what do I want?") is in conflict with the need to establish connections with other people. Schnarch achieved this through collaborative confrontation (with himself and the partner), through self-confirmed (instead of third-party-confirmed) intimacy and through the promotion of self-respect and respect for others.

Differentiation-based psychotherapy has been included in the training program for psychiatrists and psychologists at some US universities. Their use is not limited to couple and sex therapy.

Writings 

 Constructing the Sexual Crucible: An Integration of Sexual and Marital Therapy. WW. Norton & Company, New York, 1991, 
 Passionate Marriage: Sex, Love & Intimacy in emotionally committed relationships. WW. Norton & Company, New York, 1997. 
 Resurrecting Sex: Solving Sexual Problems and Revolutionizing Your Relationship. HarperCollins, New York, 2002,   Intimacy & Desire: Awaken the Passion in Your Relationship Beaufort Books, New York, 2009. 
 Brain Talk. How Mind Mapping Brain Science Can Change Your Life & Everyone In It. Sterling Publishers, Hardcover, Pappband, 592 Seiten,  ''

References 

2020 deaths
1946 births
21st-century American non-fiction writers
20th-century American non-fiction writers
21st-century American physicians
20th-century American physicians
People from Jefferson County, Colorado
American urologists
American psychotherapists
American clinical psychologists